William Grant Corkhill (23 April 1910 – 9 August 1978) was a Northern Irish footballer who played in the Football League for Cardiff City and Notts County. Corkhill's grandson Greg Tempest also became a professional footballer and played for Notts County.

References

External links
 

English Football League players
1910 births
1978 deaths
Marine F.C. players
Notts County F.C. players
Cardiff City F.C. players
Scunthorpe United F.C. managers
Bradford (Park Avenue) A.F.C. managers
Association footballers from Belfast
Association football wing halves
Association footballers from Northern Ireland
Football managers from Northern Ireland
English Football League managers